

The Security Airster S-1 is an American two-seat single-engined monoplane designed by Bert Kinner and built by his Security National Aircraft Corporation later named the American Aircraft Corporation.

Development
The Airster S-1 appeared in 1933 after the designer Bert Kinner had started the Security National Aircraft Corporation to build it. The Airster S-1-A was a side-by-side two-seat single-engined low-wing braced monoplane, it had folding wings and a fixed tailwheel landing gear. The aircraft was powered by one of Kinners engines the 100 hp (75 kW) Kinner K-5 radial. A coupe option was available to enclose the open cockpit. The economic situation in the United States of the early 1930s was not a good time to launch a light aircraft and only 15 were built when production of the S-1A stopped in January 1935. One of the purchasers of the aircraft turned out to be Edgar Rice Burroughs, author of the Tarzan series.
 
In 1939 with the company renamed the American Aircraft Corporation, Kinner attempted to restart production with a revised Airster S-1-B, again powered by his own engine a 125 hp (93 kW) Security S5-125 radial. Times were no better and only about five were built before the factory and assets were bought in 1942 by the National Airplane & Motor Company.

Variants
Airster S-1
Prototypes powered by 100hp (75kW) Kinner K-5 radial engine, two built.
Airster S-1-A
Production version, 12 built.
Airster S-1-B
Revised 1939 variant with a 125hp (93kW) Security S5-125 radial engine, five built.

Specifications (S-1-A)

References

Notes

Bibliography

 

1930s United States civil utility aircraft
Low-wing aircraft
Aircraft first flown in 1933